Bonnetia celiae is a species of flowering plant in the Bonnetiaceae family. It is found only in Venezuela.

References

Endemic flora of Venezuela
Vulnerable plants
celiae
Taxonomy articles created by Polbot